37th Infantry Division was an infantry division of the French Army active during the First World War.

Commanders 
 01/07/1914 :  Général Comby
 09/01/1915 :  Général Deshayes de Bonneval
 26/02/1916 - 29/10/1916 :  Général Niessel
 29/10/1916 - 06/06/1918 :  Général Garnier-Duplessix
 06/06/1918 - 28/03/1919 :  Général Simon
 .
 09/07/1923 - 19/06/1924 :  Général Vidalon
 .
 - : Général Constantine

1914-1918 order of battle

Overview
Mobilised in 19th Military Region, at Arles.

 Régiment de Marche du 2e Tirailleurs from August to September 1914, which became 1er Régiment de Marche de Tirailleurs
 Régiment de Marche du 3e Tirailleurs from August to September 1914, which became 2e Régiment de Marche de Tirailleurs
 Régiment de Marche du 5e Tirailleurs from August to September 1914, which became 1er Régiment de Marche de Tirailleurs
 Régiment de Marche du 6e Tirailleurs from August to September 1914, which became 1er Régiment de Marche de Tirailleurs
 Régiment de Marche du 7e Tirailleurs from August to September 1914, which became 2e Régiment de Marche de Tirailleurs
 1er Régiment de Marche de Tirailleurs from September 1914 to April 1915, which became 2e Régiment de Tirailleurs de Marche
 2e Régiment de Tirailleurs de Marche from September 1914 to April 1915, which became 3e Régiment de Tirailleurs de Marche
 3e Régiment de Tirailleurs de Marche from April 1915 to July 1918
 Régiment de Marche du 2e Zouaves from August 1914 to March 1915, which became 2e Régiment de Zouaves de Marche
 Régiment de Marche du 3e Zouaves from August 1914 to March 1915, which became  3e Régiment de Zouaves de Marche
 2e Régiment de Zouaves de Marche from March 1915 to November 1918
 3e Régiment de Zouaves de Marche from March 1915 to November 1918
 38e Régiment d'Infanterie Territoriale from July 1917 to November 1918

Timeline

1914 
6 – 13 August
Elements of the division which had mobilised in Algeria landed at Cette and Marseille
13–15 August
Transported by V.F. to the Rocroi region
15–24 August
Moved towards the River Sambre, via Mariembourg and Philippeville.
22 and 23 August: engaged in the Battle of Charleroi: actions at Fosse and Mettet

1915

1916

1917

1918

1919 onwards

Attachments by army corps

References

External links 
 37th Infantry Division in the Battle of the Aisne (1917)
 Journal and letters from a private in 37th Infantry Division

Infantry Division, 37th
Infantry divisions of France